Karayilekku Oru Kadal Dooram is a 2010 Malayalam film directed by Vinod Mankara, starring Indrajith, Mamta Mohandas and Dhanya Mary Varghese in the lead roles.

Plot
Anoop Chandran (Indrajith), is a famous writer and award winner. Prone to seeing future events that turn out to be real, Anoop one day sees his own death in a trance. He decides to write one final novel before death. Anoop has a wife, Meera (Sarayu), who never understands the writer in him. At the same time, Anoop is in love with dancer Gatha (Mamta Mohandas), with whom he shares a live-in relationship. Anoop always tells Gatha about his lost love Sathyabhama (Dhanya Mary Varghese), who was his lover in college. Excited about hearing Sathyabhama aka Bhama, Gatha wants to locate Bhama and goes to Anoop's tharavadu (ancestral house) with him. From there they go to Bhama's birthplace Vattakkulam to find Bhama. That place incidentally was the birthplace of Gatha's parents as well. They returned, unsuccessful in finding Bhama. Gatha went to Kolkata for her dance performances while Anoop returned to Kerala. Three months later, Gatha gets a call from Anoop. Gatha is shocked to hear that actually there was no girl named Bhama. She was an imaginary character created by Anoop for his final novel. Anoop was actually developing Bhama's story through Gatha. Anoop tells Gatha that he sent the novel to her and she has the right to give it a title and publish it. He also tells her that he is about to reach the end of his life, which he realised some time back. In the final scene, we see Anoop heading to some remote destination in the snow-clad mountains, to embrace his death.

Cast
Indrajith as Anoop Chandran
Mamta Mohandas as Gadha
Dhanya Mary Varghese as Sathyabhama
Lakshmi Sharma as "Devi" (Goddess)
Sarayu as Meera
T. P. Madhavan as Kunjettan
Jagadish as Doctor
Geetha Vijayan as Anoop's mother
M. Jayachandran as himself
Kochu Preman as the man near the temple
Valsala Menon as Anoop's grandmother
Kozhikode Narayanan Nair as Sreedhara Pisharadi
Narayanankutty as Postman
Ambika Mohan as Janaki
Kalabhavan Haneef as the man in bar
Nisha Sarang as Bhanu

Accolades
 Vinod Mankara won the 2010 Kerala Film Critics Award for the'Best Debutant Director'.
 M Jayachandran won the 2010 Kerala State Film Award for Best Music Director.

Soundtrack

The music director M. Jayachandran makes an appearance in the film as himself, performing the song "Nee Illa Enkil".

References

External links
 
 Karayilekku Oru Kadaldooram MSI
 Karayilekk Oru Kadal Dooram M3DB
Sify review

Indian romantic musical films
2010s Malayalam-language films
Films scored by M. Jayachandran
2010 films
2010s romantic musical films